Currently there are three electoral districts in Central Province, Sri Lanka.

The country's 1978 Constitution introduced a new proportional representation electoral system for electing members of Parliament from 1989 onwards. The existing single-member, double-member and triple-member districts were replaced with multi-member electoral districts, similar to the existing administrative districts of Sri Lanka. The remaining districts by 1989 continues to be a polling division of the current multi-member electoral districts.

1947 to 1989

Since 1989

Notes

References

Electoral districts of Sri Lanka